Piroctone olamine (INN; also known as piroctone ethanolamine;) is a compound sometimes used in the treatment of fungal infections. Piroctone olamine is the ethanolamine salt of the hydroxamic acid derivative piroctone.

It is often used in anti-dandruff shampoo as a replacement for the commonly used compound zinc pyrithione. It is structurally similar to ciclopirox and pyrithione, containing a substituted pyridine (pyridinone) group which inhibits ergosterol synthesis.

References

Antifungals
Hydroxamic acids
Ethanolamines
2-Pyridones
Cosmetics chemicals